Hollywood Be Thy Name is a live album by New Orleans R&B artist Dr. John. It was produced by producer Bob Ezrin. The recording venue, Willie Purple's Niteclub, was in reality Cherokee Recording Studios with a live audience.

Track listing

Personnel

Musicians
 Dr. John – keyboards, vocals
 Ronnie Barron – keyboards, vocals on "Will The Circle Be Broken"
 Steve Hunter – guitar
 Kenny Ascher – keyboards
 Johnny Badanjek – drums
 John Boudreaux – drums
 Tommy Vig – percussion
 Bob Ezrin – keyboards, vocals
 Julius Farmer – bass
 Alvin Robinson – guitar, vocals on "It's All Right With Me"
 James Herb Smith – guitar
 Tommy Bolin - guitar
 Clifford Solomon – tenor saxophone
 Ernie Watts – tenor saxophone
 Leroy Cooper – baritone saxophone
 Chauncey Welsch – trombone
 Warren Luening – trumpet
 Bobby Torres – conductor

The Creolettes
 Venetta Fields – backing vocals 
 Robbie Montgomery – backing vocals 
 Tammy Lann – backing vocals

Technical
 Bob Ezrin – producer, engineer, arranger
 Bruce Robb, Colonel Tubby, David Hines, Dee Robb, George Tutko – assistant engineers
 Jim Frank – mixing engineer
 Fred Wesley, Julius Farmer – horn arrangements
 Bob Cato – art direction, design
 Doug Metzler – artwork, photography
 Paul Ruscha – photography

References

Dr. John albums
Albums produced by Bob Ezrin
1975 live albums
United Artists Records live albums